Bupyeong District (Bupyeong-gu) is one of the 10 administrative divisions (eight municipal districts and two counties) that comprise Incheon, South Korea. Bupyeong-gu comprises an area of 12.35 square miles (31.98 square km), and has a population of 508,587. It is located north of Namdong-gu, east of Seo-gu, and south of Gyeyang-gu.  The city of Bucheon, in neighboring Gyeonggi Province, comprises its eastern limit.

History
Bupyeong-gu was created as its own district in 1995 when 'Buk-gu' was split into 'Gyeyang-gu' and 'Bupyeong-gu' due to rapid growth in the region.  Before the 1970s, much of the area was rich farmland. However, with rapid industrial development and the construction of large apartment complexes, the farmland quickly disappeared leaving what is today a large urban district.

History of "old Bupyeong"
Old Bupyeong was an administrative district, distinctive from Incheon, before 1914, when the Japanese colonial government merged it with outer parts of old Incheon into Bucheon County. Bupyeong Metropolitan Prefecture (i.e. Buyeong Dohobu, 부평도호부) consisted of today's Bupyeong-gu, Gyeyang-gu, Seo-gu(excepting Geomdan) in Incheon, Bucheon City in Gyeonggi, and western part of Guro-gu in Seoul. In 1895, Bupyeong Metropolitan Prefecture was degraded to Bupyeong County. The city centre was in Gyesan-dong, Gyeyang-gu. The two remaining buildings of the Bupyeong prefecture office are located in Bupyeong Elementary School.

Only Sipjeong-dong was part of Juan township of old Incheon, other than old Bupyeong.

Old Bupyeong was traditionally a district of higher hierarchy than old Incheon in the administrative district system before Incheon became a metropolitan prefecture in early Joseon, and was a military centre for coastal Gyeonggi area, covering old Incheon, Tongjin, Gimpo, Yangcheon, Ansan, Siheung, Gwacheon, and so on.

 January 1, 1968 Establishment of Buk-gu, Incheon, Gyeonggi-do.
 July 1, 1981 Buk-gu, Incheon Direct Control City
 January 1, 1988 Transfer of its western parts such as Geomam-dong and Yeonhui-dong to Seo-gu.
 May 1, 1988 Elevated to autonomous district.
 January 1, 1989 Gyeyang-myeon, Gimpo-gun, Gyeonggi-do included in Buk-gu.
 January 1, 1995 Buk-gu, Incheon Metropolitan City
 March 1, 1995 Name change from  Buk-gu to Bupyeong-gu, and creation of Gyeyang-gu by dividing part of Bupyeong-gu.
 April 20, 2006 Sub-division of Samsan-dong to Samsan-1-dong and Samsan-2-dong.

Overview
At the core of the district is Bupyeong Station.  The station lies at the intersection of the Incheon Subway Line 1 and Seoul Subway Line 1, instantly making it one of the busiest subway stations in all of Korea. It is also possible to reach Bupyeong-Gu Office via Seoul Subway Line 7 and Incheon Subway Line 1.

The area around Bupyeong Station includes the Bupyeong Underground Market, which boasts hundreds of small shops selling mostly clothing and make-up, and the Bupyeong Cultural Street, a walking street which holds several performances and cultural events throughout the year.  The area also contains many restaurants and bars, making it a popular weekend destination for residents of Incheon.  Nearby is Bupyeong Market, a large traditional market where vendors sell fresh meat,  produce, and traditional medicine.

Daewoo Motors which is now GM Korea is a subsidiary of largest American automotive manufacturer General Motors, has its company headquarters and is the largest automobile manufacturing plant in Bupyeong. The GM Korea Design Center, which is said to "play an important role in GM's Global Design organization," is located there.

Incheon's professional basketball team, the ET Land Elephants, plays at Samsan Gymnasium in Bupyeong.

Camp Market

Bupyeong District is also home to Camp Market, a small United States Army depot.

Administrative divisions

The administrative divisions of Bupyeong District consist of 22 dongs.  Bupyeong District is approximately 3.09% of the area of Incheon with an area of 31.98 km2.

Sister Cities and Regions 

 Nam-gu, Daegu
 Gwangju Metropolitan City
 Yuseong-gu, Daejeon Metropolitan City 
 Ulsan Metropolitan City
 Pyeongchang-gun, Gangwon-do 
 Chungju, Chungcheongbuk-do
 Geumsan-gun, Chungcheongnam-do
 Gunwi County, Gyeongsangbuk-do 
 Goseong-gun, Gyeongsangnam-do
 Muju-gun, Jeollabuk-do
 Wando-gun, Jeollanam-do
 Seogwipo, Jeju Special Self-Governing Province

 Jackson County, Oregon
 Udomphon,

Notable people from Bupyeong District
 Park Ji-sun (Hangul: 박지선), South Korean comedian and actress 
 Doyeon (Real Name: Kim Do-yeon, Hangul: 김도연), singer, dancer, actress and K-pop idol, member of K-pop girlgroups Weki Meki and WJMK
 Kei (Real Name: Kim Ji-yeon, Hangul: 김지연), singer, dancer, actress and K-pop idol, member of K-pop girlgroup Lovelyz

References

External links
 Official Website 
 Incheon Bupyeong Pungmul Festival

 
Districts of Incheon